I Wanna Talk About You is an album by pianist Tete Montoliu recorded in 1980 and released on the Danish SteepleChase label.

Reception

Ken Dryden of AllMusic said: "Tete Montoliu's releases are inevitably a joy to hear; this 1980 studio session with bassist George Mraz and drummer Al Foster is no exception. ... Tenor saxophonist Hank Mobley, who by 1980 had pretty much retired from performing due to ill health, makes one of his final record dates by guesting on "Autumn Leaves"; he starts slow but ends up turning in a fine performance. Highly recommended."

Track listing
All compositions by Tete Montoliu except where noted
 "Nexus, Plexus, Sexus"- 7:09
 "Blues for Wim and Maxine" – 7:29
 "Scandia Skies" (Kenny Dorham) – 6:44
 "Jo Vull Que M' Acariciis (Caress Me)" – 9:40		
 "I Wanna Talk About You" (Billy Eckstine) – 11:37
 "Confirmation" (Charlie Parker) – 7:36 Bonus track on CD	
 "Autumn Leaves" (Joseph Kosma) – 8:08 Bonus track on CD

Personnel
Tete Montoliu – piano
George Mraz – bass
Al Foster – drums
Hank Mobley – tenor saxophone (track 7)

References

Tete Montoliu albums
1980 albums
SteepleChase Records albums